Gerd Uecker (born 15 September 1946) is a German  music pedagogue, music and opera director. From 2003 to 2010 he was artistic director of the Semperoper in Dresden.

Life 
Born in Munich, Uecker studied piano, music education and conducting at the Hochschule für Musik und Theater München after his Abitur. At the beginning of his career, Uecker worked as a solo repetiteur at the Cologne Opera from 1969, where he met the director Jean-Pierre Ponnelle. In 1970 he received a teaching assignment for opera at the Rheinisches Musikkonservatorium in Cologne. In 1973 Uecker was appointed music director and head of the opera department of the Southeast Bavarian Städtetheater in Passau. In 1979 Uecker came to the Bavarian State Opera in Munich, where he held the position of musical director. Three years later he took over the direction of the director's office. In 1988 he became artistic director and Deputy Director General and at the beginning of 1993 Interim Artistic Director of the State Opera. From September 1993, he was finally appointed opera director and responsible for the management of the opera house in the Bavarian capital. In January 2000, Uecker was given the task by the Minister of State for Science and the Arts, Hans Joachim Meyer, of managing the Semperoper from the 2003/2004 season. From 2005 Uecker was chairman of the German Opera Conference. He had assumed the office of Sir Peter Jonas, the artistic director of the Bavarian State Opera. Since 2007, Uecker has been Chairman of the University Council of the Musikhochschule Lübeck. He has taught in Venice, Beijing and Stuttgart and is honorary professor at the Hochschule für Musik und Theater München and at the Bayerische Theaterakademie August Everding. He is also a guest lecturer at the European Academy for Music and Performing Arts in Montepulciano and at the Dresden Academy of Music. Since 2011 he is Honorary Chairman of the Bundeswettbewerb Gesang Berlin e.V.

Further reading 
 Stiftung zur Förderung der Semperoper (editor): Beständig ist nur der Wandel: Über-Regionale Ermunterungen aus der Semperoper – Intendanz Gerd Uecker 2003-2010, Dresden Buch, Dresden 2010, 
 Traumberuf Opernsänger: Von der Ausbildung zum Engagement, Leipzig 2012, 

German music educators
German opera directors
Musicians from Munich
1946 births
Living people